Sir Kenneth Malcolm McCaw QC (8 October 1907 – 13 September 1989), an Australian politician, was a member of the New South Wales Legislative Assembly representing Lane Cove for the Liberal Party from 1947 until his retirement from political office in 1975. McCaw served as Attorney General of New South Wales from 1965 to 1975.

Early years and background
McCaw was born in Chatswood, New South Wales. he was the son of a teamster and was educated in country schools. He initially worked as a farm hand but then moved to Sydney, was employed as a clerk and continued to study at night. He was admitted as a solicitor in 1934 and was active in the New South Wales Law Society and community groups in the Lane Cove district.

Political career
McCaw entered the New South Wales parliament at the 1947 election as the Liberal member for Lane Cove; defeating the sitting Labor member Henry Woodward. He retained the seat at the next nine elections and retired in 1975.

With the election of the coalition government of Robert Askin at the 1965 election, McCaw was appointed Attorney-General. He held this position until his retirement. In 1967 he recommended to Cabinet that women be called for jury service although the 1968 legislation did not commence operation until 1974 and then only in part of NSW.

During his term in office, he was appointed Queen's Counsel, in 1972.

Career after politics
On retirement from politics, McCaw was awarded a Knight Bachelor, which does not carry post-nominals.

References

 

1907 births
1989 deaths
Australian diplomats
Australian King's Counsel
Australian solicitors
Attorneys General of New South Wales
Australian Knights Bachelor
Members of the New South Wales Legislative Assembly
Liberal Party of Australia members of the Parliament of New South Wales
Politicians awarded knighthoods
20th-century Australian lawyers
20th-century Australian politicians